Ajmer Singh Aulakh (19 August 1942 – 15 June 2017) was a renowned Punjabi playwright from Mansa district, Punjab. He was born in 1942 at Kishangarh urf Pharwahi, Mansa district, Punjab, India.

Books and plays
Aulakh published his first collection of one-act plays, Arbad narbad dhundukara (English: 'Eons and Nebulae') in 1978.

Collections of one-act plays
Arbad narbad dhundukara (Eons and Nebulae)
Begane bohar di chhan (Shade of the Alien Banyan)
Anhe nishanchi (Blind Shooters)
 Gani

Plays
Ik Ramayan hor (One More Ramayana)*Niuṃ-jaṛa 
Satt begaane
 Kehar Singh di maut (Kehar Singh's Death) 
Ishaka bājha namāza dā hajja nāhī 
 Bhajian bahin (Broken Arms)
Ikka sī dariā 
Jhanāṃ de pāṇī 
Aise jana wirale sam̆sāre

Awards
He won the Sahitya Akademi Award in 2006 for his book Ishaka bājha namāza dā hajja nāhī (Plays).

See Also 
 List of Sahitya Akademi Award winners for Punjabi

References 

1942 births
2017 deaths
People from Mansa district, India
Dramatists and playwrights from Punjab, India
Punjabi-language writers
Recipients of the Sahitya Akademi Award in Punjabi
20th-century Indian dramatists and playwrights
Deaths from cancer in India